Blatnitsa is a small village in the Strelcha municipality, western Bulgaria. As of 2005 it has 232 inhabitants.

Villages in Pazardzhik Province